Daniel Vázquez Evuy (born 11 March 1985), known as Evuy, is a Spanish-born Equatoguinean former footballer who played as a defender. He has been a member of the Equatorial Guinea national team.

Career
Evuy began his career in the CD Mostoles, a club of Madrid south. Before Evuy go to the Rayo vallecano of Madrid where be six years. In the Rayo Vallecano national category he was selected for the Madrid Community selection during two years. After there were rumors that were placing the player in the VFB Stuttgart.

International career
Evuy was called for play with the Equatorial Guinea national team in the Africa Cup of Nations 2008 Qualifying match against Cameroon on 7 October 2006.

Personal life
Evuy has born in Madrid, Spain to an Equatoguinean Bubi mother and a Spanish father.

External links

soccerdata.net
Fútbol Estadísticas 

1985 births
Living people
Citizens of Equatorial Guinea through descent
Equatoguinean footballers
Association football fullbacks
Meistriliiga players
JK Tallinna Kalev players
National Premier Soccer League players
New York Cosmos B players
Equatorial Guinea international footballers
2012 Africa Cup of Nations players
2015 Africa Cup of Nations players
Equatoguinean sportspeople of Spanish descent
Equatoguinean expatriate footballers
Equatoguinean expatriate sportspeople in Estonia
Expatriate footballers in Estonia
Equatoguinean expatriate sportspeople in the United States
Expatriate soccer players in the United States
Spanish footballers
Footballers from the Community of Madrid
Spanish sportspeople of Equatoguinean descent
Segunda División B players
AD Alcorcón footballers
CD Móstoles footballers
Tercera División players
Rayo Vallecano B players
Real Murcia Imperial players
Divisiones Regionales de Fútbol players
AD Alcorcón B players
Las Rozas CF players
Spanish expatriate footballers
Spanish expatriate sportspeople in Estonia
Spanish expatriate sportspeople in the United States